Events from the year 1830 in Denmark.

Incumbents
 Monarch – Frederick VI
 Prime minister – Otto Joachim

Events

=Culture

Art
 Wilhelm Bendz paints The Waagepetersen Family-

Births
 18 April – Louise Bille-Brahe, court member (died 1910)
 13 December – Mathilde Fibiger, feminist, novelist and telegraphist (died 1872)

Deaths
 22 April – Knud Lyne Rahbek, literary historian, critic, writer, poet, magazine editor and art administrator (born 1760)
 14 May  Urban Jürgensen, clockmaker (born 1776)

References

 
1830s in Denmark
Denmark
Years of the 19th century in Denmark